Christina Rees (born 21 February 1954) is a Member of Parliament  who served as Shadow Secretary of State for Wales in the Shadow Cabinet of Jeremy Corbyn from 2017 to 2020. She has been MP for Neath since 2015. Rees was elected as a Welsh Labour Co-operative Party MP, but was suspended from the party on 13 October 2022 due to allegations of bullying.

Early life 
Rees was born in the village of Kenfig Hill in south Wales. Her father died when she was a young teenager and she was brought up by her mother.

Rees became head girl of Cynffig Comprehensive School and excelled at a number of sports. Speaking as an adult, she stated: "I was very shy when I was a child and was bullied, so my mother sent me to judo classes to strengthen me up. I got a black belt first dan when I was 13." Rees represented Wales Schools at tennis, hockey, and athletics. Rees was also a member of the Great Britain Youth Team that competed at the Munich Olympics.

Rees was most successful at squash, a sport for which she has represented Wales over 100 times.

Career 
Rees is a barrister.

Rees stood as the Labour candidate for Arfon in the National Assembly for Wales elections in May 2011, and was placed fourth on Labour's Wales-wide list for the 2014 European Elections.

Rees became MP for Neath following the UK general election of 2015.

Rees was appointed Shadow Minister for Courts and Legal Aid in January 2016, but quit her position during the mass resignation of Shadow ministers following the EU referendum. She supported Owen Smith in the 2016 Labour Party (UK) leadership election. She later became one of 33 Labour MPs to return to the front bench, taking the Courts and Legal Aid portfolio once again.

In February 2017, she was appointed to the position of Shadow Secretary of State for Wales.

Rees was re-elected at the 2019 United Kingdom general election but with a majority half of that she had in 2017.

In the 2020 Labour Party leadership election, Rees endorsed Keir Starmer for Labour Leader. She also endorsed Angela Rayner for deputy leader.

In April 2020, Rees announced that she would not be returning to the Official Opposition frontbench under Keir Starmer. Rees was replaced in the new Shadow Cabinet as Shadow Welsh Secretary by Nia Griffith.

Rees was suspended from Labour on 13 October 2022, following allegations of bullying. She sits as an independent MP.

Personal life 
Rees was married to fellow Welsh politician and former Secretary of State for Wales, Ron Davies.  The couple divorced in 1999 and have one daughter, Angharad.

Rees is a vegan.

References

External links 
 
 
 

|-

1954 births
Living people
Female members of the Parliament of the United Kingdom for Welsh constituencies
Labour Co-operative MPs for Welsh constituencies
UK MPs 2015–2017
UK MPs 2017–2019
UK MPs 2019–present
Welsh Labour councillors
21st-century British women politicians
People from Bridgend
People from Neath
Welsh barristers
Welsh female athletes
British female athletes
Women councillors in Wales
Politicians affected by a party expulsion process
Independent members of the House of Commons of the United Kingdom
Spouses of British politicians